Edward and George Cary Eggleston House is a historic home located at Vevay, Switzerland County, Indiana. It was built in 1837, and is a two-story, rectangular brick dwelling with a -story rear ell.  It was the boyhood home of authors and brothers Edward Eggleston (1837–1902) and George Cary Eggleston (1839-1911).

It was listed on the National Register of Historic Places in 1973.

References

Houses on the National Register of Historic Places in Indiana
Houses completed in 1837
Buildings and structures in Switzerland County, Indiana
National Register of Historic Places in Switzerland County, Indiana